Indian 2 is an upcoming Indian Tamil-language vigilante action film directed by S. Shankar, intended as a sequel to his 1996 film Indian, and produced by Lyca Productions and Red Giant Movies. The film stars an ensemble cast of Kamal Haasan, Kajal Aggarwal , Gulshan Grover, Nedumudi Venu, Siddharth , Rakul Preet Singh, Priya Bhavani Shankar, Samuthirakani, Bobby Simha, Guru Somasundaram, Delhi Ganesh, Jayaprakash and Vennela Kishore. The music is composed by Anirudh Ravichander, with cinematography done by Ravi Varman and Rathnavelu and editing performed by A. Sreekar Prasad.

Indian 2 was announced in September 2017. Principal photography began in January 2019 and took place in Chennai, Rajahmundry and Bhopal. The shooting was halted following an accident on the sets in February 2020, leading to death of few crew members. Production had been suspended since then owing to numerous factors, including the COVID-19 pandemic, cost overruns and legal disputes, before resuming in August 2022.

Cast 

 Kamal Haasan as Senapathy / Indian, a freedom fighter turned vigilante 
 Kajal Aggarwal
 Gulshan Grover
 Nedumudi Venu as Krishnasamy IPS
 Siddharth
 Rakul Preet Singh
 Priya Bhavani Shankar
 Samuthirakani
 Bobby Simha
 Delhi Ganesh
 Jayaprakash
 Vivek
 Guru Somasundaram
 Vennela Kishore
 George Maryan
 Manobala
 Sivaji Guruvayoor
 Nandu Poduval
 Ravi Venkatraman
Vinod Sagar
Shyam Prasad
 Deepa Shankar

Production

Development 
Shankar began discussing plans to make a sequel to his 1996 film, Indian, as early as May 2015. Initial discussions were held with the producer of the original film, A. M. Rathnam of Sri Surya Movies, who stated it was too early to talk about the project. Shankar later became busy with the production of 2.0 (2018) and delayed starting the project, but he continued working on a story theme for Indian 2. In late-September 2017, the film was then publicly announced during the finale of the Tamil reality television show Bigg Boss Tamil in Chennai. The show's host Kamal Haasan, who also played the lead in the original film, was confirmed as the lead actor and prominent Telugu film producer Dil Raju was announced to fund the project, for his film studio Sri Venkateswara Creations, thus marking his debut in Tamil. However, Raju backed out producing the film, citing the high production costs involved, and later Allirajah Subaskaran of Lyca Productions took over as the film's producer in October 2017.

The film marks Shankar's reunion with Haasan after a hiatus of 24 years. Shankar decided to work with Anirudh Ravichander for the first time, rather than his regular collaborator A. R. Rahman, who scored music for its predecessor. His inclusion was later confirmed in late December 2018. Art director T. Muthuraj was hired to work for the film. Ravi Varman agreed to work for the cinematography in the film, but due to production delays, meant that he could not commit dates for the films, and was replaced by R. Rathnavelu. Writers Jeyamohan, Kabilan Vairamuthu and Lakshmi Saravanakumar were all signed on to help complete the film's script and dialogues.

Despite several proposed announcements of starting dates, the film's shoot was delayed throughout 2018 owing to Shankar's commitments with 2.0, which also faced significant production delays. Haasan also decided to use the time to release his long-delayed Vishwaroopam II (2018) and commit to his political career. In August 2018, Shankar and Haasan, announced that the film's shoot will commence in December 2018, Lyca Productions, later officially announced the film on 7 November 2018, coinciding with Haasan's birthday. Muthuraj began working on the production design during November 2018, as the film's shoot was scheduled to start in late 2018; however the delay in its set work, made the team to postpone its shoot to early-2019.

Casting 
Nayanthara was considered for the leading female role, before Kajal Aggarwal was finalised. For her role, Aggarwal learnt the basics of the Indian martial arts form Kalaripayattu. Siddharth was confirmed to play another role in the film, after the team had initially held discussions with the likes of Silambarasan, Dulquer Salmaan and Arya for the same character. Ajay Devgn agreed to play the antagonist in the film, but production delays meant that he could not commit dates for the films. Akshay Kumar, Abhishek Bachchan and John Abraham were considered as replacements, but neither actor was signed. Other actors including Delhi Ganesh and RJ Balaji were also signed to portray supporting roles in the film. However, Balaji opted out of the film in October 2019. Nedumudi Venu was also set to reprise his role from the first film, but he died in October 2021 after post-coronavirus complications.

Closer to the start of the second schedule, actors Vidyut Jammwal and Bobby Simha were signed on for roles. While, the latter confirmed his role in the film, the former denied such claims. Rakul Preet Singh also joined the film to star opposite the character essayed by Siddharth, Aishwarya Rajesh was expected to join the film, but due to call sheet issues, she was replaced by Priya Bhavani Shankar. Vivek confirmed that he will be a part of the project, collaborating with Haasan for the first time, where he plays the role of a CBI officer in the film. It was considered to be one of his final films before his death in April 2021. Actors Samuthirakani and George Maryan also joined the cast in supporting roles. After Shankar was impressed with Telugu actor Vennela Kishore's performance in Bhale Bhale Magadivoy (2015), Kishore was announced to play a supporting role and has allotted 70 days for the film, making his full-fledged Tamil debut. Manobala was hired for an important role. Vivek's portions had to be reshot due to his untimely death.

Filming 
A series of promotional posters featuring Haasan in his character were released in early January 2019 and production subsequently started on 18 January 2019. A week-long shoot was held at a memorial home near Government General Hospital in Chennai, before the team also shot scenes at a nearby film studio. However the film was again delayed after the makers had trouble with the created sets. The shoot was pushed further owing to the Indian general election in May 2019, where Haasan's political party participated. Throughout the development process in 2018 and early 2019, the makers regularly denied media reports that the film had been shelved. Later, the shooting was resumed in May 2019, post elections. Owing to the long break between the schedules, cinematographer Ravi Varman also left the project after becoming committed to Mani Ratnam's Ponniyin Selvan: I, and was subsequently replaced by R. Rathnavelu who previously worked with Shankar in Enthiran (2010).

The second schedule began on 12 August 2019, at MGR Film City in Chennai, with scenes featuring Rakul Preet Singh being shot. Siddharth and Priya Bhavani Shankar too joined the sets on 16 August, and later Haasan too joined the sets on mid-September, where his portions being filmed. Haasan and team, later moved to a city hotel in T. Nagar, to proceed the shoot further. On 11 September 2019, the team announced that the second schedule of the film which took place in Chennai has been completed. On 19 September 2019, the team went to Rajahmundry, shoot the film's sequences featuring Haasan. Later on 23 October, Haasan and his team went to Bhopal, to shoot the film at its third schedule.

On 30 October 2019, it was reported that the makers head to Gwalior for a 12-day long shoot schedule, which was completed within seven days. Post the completion, the actor went to Chennai, to attend a felicitation ceremony for his 60 years in Tamil cinema, followed by a surgery on 22 November, after he met with an accident in 2016. Scenes without featuring Haasan were canned, in order to complete major portions of the film, and planned to shoot his portions, after his recovery. On 21 January 2020, it was reported that Haasan will shoot for the film post his recovery, and it will take place at the EVP Film City, Chennai which will last for 35 days. It was reported that the film's team will change the location from China to Italy, following the fear of coronavirus pandemic.

The film's shoot was further interrupted following a major accident in the film's sets, and also due to the COVID-19 pandemic. Haasan planned to resume the shoot in January 2021 after hosting the fourth season of Bigg Boss Tamil. But the makers cited the difficulties on finishing the shoot before the Tamil Nadu elections, and planned to resume the shoot without Haasan in February 2021, with the other cast and the director were advised to keep themselves available for the shoot and planned to finish Haasan's portions after the elections. As of 28 November 2021, 60% of the film's portions have been completed with more than 100 days of the film's shoot is pending. Filming was planned to resume in December 2021, but pushed back further due to Haasan and Shankar's other commitments, In June 2022, Udhayanidhi Stalin of Red Giant Movies confirmed he had discussions with Subaskaran and that filming would resume soon, though he did not say whether he would be co-producing or distributing the film. Filming resumed on 24 August 2022 with Red Giant Movies confirmed as co-producers, while Haasan and Aggarwal joined the sets from September onwards.

Music 
The soundtrack album and background score are composed by Anirudh Ravichander, who is working with  Shankar for the very first time, and also replacing A. R. Rahman, Shankar's norm music composer, whom also worked with him in its predecessor, although since Anirudh collaborated with Haasan in Lokesh Kanagaraj's Vikram film which got released, it marks the second collaboration of Anirudh with Kamal. In an interview with an online portal Rahman stated that "Kamal had mentioned me to score for its sequel, but Shankar eventually had other ideas. Shankar is a person who wants to get inspired. Sometimes, when you work with the same person back-to-back, you get bored. Also 2.0 is a difficult film that took me a long time to complete. Maybe Shankar thought he shouldn't make me overwork. That could be one of the reasons why he had chosen Anirudh."

Anirudh Ravichander stated working with Shankar as a "dream come true moment"; he eventually quoted Indian is a cult album and one of his favourites from Rahman's composition. In an interview with India Today, Anirudh stated about the comparisons of the first part to its sequel, that "With sequels, there are always comparisons on which one is better, but then nobody can match Rahman's work. I can never recreate the magic that Indian did in the 90s. Whatever I can do to the best of my abilities is what I am trying to do." After the offer came his way in November 2017, Anirudh started composing for the songs during December 2017, and it took a year to complete the album, stating that the delay in the release of 2.0, have given him much time to work on the film's songs.

In May 2018, lyricist Thamarai was hired to write one of the songs in the film, in her maiden collaboration with Shankar. During the film's launch, lyricists Pa. Vijay, Vignesh Shivan and Vivek were hired for the technical crew. It was further reported that Haresh Vikram, an independent artist from Malaysia, was reported to provide vocals for one of the songs in the soundtrack.

Legal issues

Accident in the sets 
On 19 February 2020, during the shooting of the film, a crane carrying a heavy flash light fell on the sets, resulting in the deaths of three crew members, including an assistant director and leaving ten more injured. Haasan, Shankar and Aggarwal had narrow escapes. A case was filed against Lyca Productions, along with three other persons by the Chennai police in connection with the accident on 21 February; The crane operator Rajan who absconded post the incident, was arrested and booked under three sections, the same day. Later Haasan and Shankar were summoned by the CBI, to investigate the accident during the sets.

On 26 February 2020, a week after the accident, Haasan wrote a letter to Lyca Productions, to conduct a safety audit, in order to prevent any unfortunate accidents. The very same day, the CEO of Lyca Productions, Allirajah Subaskaran, released a statement on Twitter, stating the shoot was held completely under the supervision of Haasan and Shankar. On 28 February, Shankar announced that, a donation of  crore will be given to the family of the deceased. Following the accident, the team planned to shift the shooting location from EVP Film City to Binny Mills.

Delay in film production 
While Haasan planned to resume shooting in January 2021, he also signed Vikram during the intermediate timeline, and Shankar also felt disappointed with the production house for not taking a call on the resumption of the shoot. According to The Times of India, they had been told that:

The report also claimed they had been told that Shankar had completed around 60% cent of the film's portions, including the intermission sequence, and "Even though Kamal is now focusing on Lokesh's project, he is also keen on wrapping up this film because he feels the film will give a major boost to his political image in the upcoming state elections, and wants it to release at least by summer 2021." However the company's COO, P. Kannan, denied it as a baseless rumour and stated that they did not get any kind of such information from the director. He added, "The film requires a huge crew of 500-600 people on the set, so the planning is going on. We are in the process of deciding how to move forward with the shoot, and in fact, we met Kamal Haasan yesterday to discuss this. We are hoping to resume the shoot soon." Aggarwal, in March 2021, had stated that the reason for the delay as most of the crew members are from the United States, they are unable to travel and work here in India due to COVID-19 travel restrictions.

Following the delay over the film's shooting, Shankar had planned to direct his next untitled film with Ram Charan, and also the Hindi remake of Anniyan, with Ranveer Singh. In April 2021, Lyca Productions submitted a suit against Shankar to restrain directing any other film before his commitments with the film. However, Shankar denied Lyca's allegations and also argued that the production house cannot prevent him from making other films. The court ordered Shankar and Lyca Productions to settle this issue amicably, but negotiations failed, with Shankar blaming Haasan and Lyca for the delay. In June 2021, the Madras High Court denied the producer's appeal to stop Shankar directing other films. In June 2022, following the release of Vikram, Haasan stated that they would resume Indian 2 once Shankar completes his film starring Charan. In August 2022, Shankar announced that he will be filming both Indian 2 and RC15, simultaneously.

References

External links 
 

Film productions suspended due to the COVID-19 pandemic
Films directed by S. Shankar
Films postponed due to the COVID-19 pandemic
Films scored by Anirudh Ravichander
Films shot in Chennai
Films shot in Rajahmundry
Indian action thriller films
Indian sequel films
Indian vigilante films
Upcoming films
Upcoming Tamil-language films